Deník is a regional daily newspaper in the Czech Republic.

History and profile
Denik is published by Vltava Labe Media (VLM), which since November 2015 is owned by Penta Investments. Before that it was owned by German publishing company Verlagsgruppe Passau (VGP). VGP has a monopoly on the Czech regional press. In September 2006, regional newspapers across the country were rebranded to Deník with a regional adjective appended, e.g. Pražský deník (Prague deník). As well as the Prague version, a further 72 regional newspapers were branded as part of this launch.

The 2007 circulation of the paper was 328,319 copies, making it the second most read paper in the country. The circulation of Deník was 295,307 copies in 2008 and 247,987 copies in 2009. It was 224,122 copies in 2010 and 204,084 copies in 2011.

See also
 List of newspapers in the Czech Republic

References

External links
 

2006 establishments in the Czech Republic
Publications established in 2006
Daily newspapers published in the Czech Republic
Czech-language newspapers
Newspapers published in Prague